BiZZdesign Enterprise Studio, formerly BiZZdesign Architect, is a visual modeling and design tool for Enterprise Architecture, that supports the application of ArchiMate and TOGAF, as well other enterprise architecture frameworks.

The platform supports the modelling, visualisation, analysis and documentation of enterprise architecture from different viewpoints and with multiple views. Additionally it supports the modeling business goals and requirements. It also supports automatic data collection, and can import data from office applications.

BiZZdesign Enterprise Studio is developed by BiZZdesign and first released in 2004 as BiZZdesign Architect. Its development is based on the results of the ArchiMate project, and intends to offer a high value enterprise architecture modelling tool which business management itself can control. In 2012 it is recognized by Gartner and Forrester Research as one of the leading enterprise architecture tools.

Features 
Support of enterprise architecture frameworks, such as:
 ArchiMate
 DYA framework
 Integrated Architecture Framework (IAF)
 Pragmatic Enterprise Architecture framework (PEAF).
 Tapscott 
 TOGAF
 Zachman framework
And other related frameworks.

Besides these architecture frameworks the tool also has native support for and interoperability with:
 Business Process Model and Notation

References

External links 
 BiZZdesign Enterprise Studio at bizzdesign.com

Data modeling tools
Enterprise architecture
Enterprise modelling
Integrated development environments
Web service development tools